The Tobasco Mine and Mill, near Lake City, Colorado was listed on the National Register of Historic Places in 2008.

It is located in both San Juan and Hinsdale counties, south of San Juan County Road 5 and Hinsdale County Road 34.

References

National Register of Historic Places in Hinsdale County, Colorado
National Register of Historic Places in San Juan County, Colorado
Buildings and structures completed in 1898